Jennata   is a local authority in Southern Lebanon, located in Tyre District, Governorate of South Lebanon.

Name
According to E. H. Palmer, the name comes from Jennat, garden.

History
In 1875, Victor Guérin found the village, (which he called Djennateh), to have 60 Metawileh inhabitants. He further noted: "The village contains a number of ruined houses. A little mosque is partly built of
ancient materials."

In 1881, the PEF's Survey of Western Palestine (SWP) described it: "A small village of stone and mud, containing about 100 Moslems. […] It lies low, on arable land. The water is supplied by two wells in the village."

References

Bibliography

External links
Jennata, Localiban
Survey of Western Palestine, Map 2:   IAA, Wikimedia commons

Populated places in Tyre District
Shia Muslim communities in Lebanon